Liatris punctata is a species of flowering plant in the family Asteraceae known by the common names dotted gayfeather, dotted blazingstar, and narrow-leaved blazingstar. It is native to North America, where it occurs throughout the plains of central Canada, the central United States, and northern Mexico.

Description
The heads contain several flowers which are usually purple, but sometimes white. The fruit is an achene tipped with a long pappus of feathery bristles. The plant reproduces sexually by seed and vegetatively by sprouting from its rhizome. This species is slow-growing and long-lived, with specimens estimated to be over 35 years old.

Distribution and habitat
This plant occurs in Canada from Alberta to Manitoba, in most of the central United States and part of Mexico. There are three varieties, with var. punctata in western areas, var. nebraskana more common to the east, and var. mexicana in Oklahoma and Texas.

This species grows in a wide variety of habitat types, including ponderosa pine forests, sagebrush, chaparral, pinyon–juniper woodland, and many types of grassland and prairie. It is drought-tolerant because of its deep roots, but is less abundant with less water. It is also fire-tolerant, able to resprout from its rhizome and disperse its seeds via wind to soil cleared of litter by fire. On plains and prairies it grows with many types of grasses, such as Scribner's panic grass (Panicum scribnerianum) and tumble grass (Schedonnardus paniculatus), and wildflowers such as heath aster (Symphyotrichum ericoides), tick-trefoil (Desmodium sessilifolium), and oldfield goldenrod (Solidago nemoralis). It is a host plant for the hemiparasitic wholeleaf Indian paintbrush (Castilleja integra).

Ecology
This plant is palatable to livestock and wild ungulates such as elk, white-tailed deer, and pronghorn. Its nectar is favored by lepidopterans, such as the rare butterfly Pawnee montane skipper (Hesperia leonardus montana), which is known to occur wherever the plant does.

Uses 
Native Americans ate the roots and leaves.

This species is considered good for revegetating prairie habitat. It is also used as an ornamental plant.

References

External links
 
 

punctata
Flora of the Canadian Prairies
Flora of the United States
Flora of New Mexico
Flora of Louisiana
Plants described in 1833
Flora of North America